Shaun Leon Hadley (born 6 February 1980) is an English former professional footballer. He was born in Birmingham and played professionally for Torquay United.

Hadley began his career as an apprentice at Torquay United, turning professional in June 1998. His debut came on 10 October 1998, replacing Tony Bedeau late in the 2–2 draw at home to Carlisle United. His only other first team appearance came the following month, again as a substitute for Bedeau, in Torquay's 1–0 defeat at home to Peterborough United.

He was released by the Gulls in February 1999 and joined Taunton Town, winning a Western League Championship medal by the end of the season. In the summer of 1999 he moved to Bideford, managed by former Torquay player Sean William Joyce, in search of first team football.

He was still with Bideford in April 2000, but by August 2002 was back in the Midlands playing for Oldbury United. He was still with Oldbury in August 2003.

In September 2005, Hadley was back in Devon, playing for Buckland Athletic.

References

External links

1980 births
Living people
Footballers from Birmingham, West Midlands
English footballers
Torquay United F.C. players
Taunton Town F.C. players
Bideford A.F.C. players
Oldbury United F.C. players
Buckland Athletic F.C. players
Association football forwards